Baron Augustin-Marie d'Aboville (1776–1843) was a French artillery officer during the French Revolutionary Wars and Napoleonic Wars, who rose to the rank of general of brigade. He was the son of General François-Marie d'Aboville (1730–1817) and younger brother of General Augustin Gabriel d'Aboville, both fellow artillery commanders.

Early career
Born on 20 April 1776 in La Fère, in a noble family from northern France, on 12 March 1792 he became a student in the artillery school and held the rank of sublieutenant. He graduated on 1 September with the rank of lieutenant in the 7th regiment of artillery. Seeing active service at the outbreak of the French Revolutionary Wars, he took part to the campaign of 1792 and served in the French "Army of Italy", attaining the rank of captain. During the radical phase of the Revolution, he was suspended from his duties, because of his noble origins, but was quickly reinstated on 25 November 1794. He subsequently served in the "Army of the Rhine and Moselle" and in the "Army of Italy", seeing continuous active service from 1797 to 1800. Promoted to Battalion Commander on 2 October 1802, he became a Major of the 2nd regiment of horse artillery (22 May 1803). Between 1803 and 1804, his unit was integrated in the "Army of England", a force with which Napoleon intended to invade the United Kingdom. D'Aboville received the prestigious Legion of Honour in 1803.

Napoleonic Wars
The debut of the Napoleonic Wars saw d'Aboville join the expedition to Martinique, under the orders of General Lauriston. During the return trip of the expedition, d'Aboville was placed in command of the 36-pounder battery of the ship of the line Bucentaure, which was involved in the battle engaged by the French squadron with that of British Admiral Robert Calder. Returning to France in June 1804, he received orders to join the "Grande Armée". He took a conspicuous part to the War of the Fourth Coalition, during which he attained the rank of colonel and was given the distinction of Officer of the Legion of Honour (1807), for saving the artillery of the 6th Corps, which had been attacked by a numerous pulk of Cossacks, on the banks of the river Passarge.

Appointed at the command of the horse artillery of the Imperial Guard on 13 September 1808, he was particularly noted at the bloody Battle of Wagram, where he was at the head of a company of thirty pieces, and had his right arm torn by a cannonball, an injury which almost cost him his life. The Emperor made him a brigadier general on 9 July 1809 and gave him the command of the artillery school of  La Fère, as well as the title of Baron of the Empire. He did not see active service again until 1814, when he was called to command the artillery during the defense of Paris, where he stoutly checked the best efforts of the enemy, inflicting considerable losses in the process. Left without a command following Napoleon's abdication, he did benefit from the favours of the new regime, when King Louis XVIII granted him the Commander's Cross of the Order of Saint Louis (5 August 1814).

Hundred Days and beyond

Upon Napoleon's return to power during the Hundred Days, General d'Aboville was at La Flèche. There, on 20 March 1815, he resisted an attempt from Generals Lefebvre-Desnouettes and Lallemand to take the village. Lefebvre-Desnouettes and Lallemand had both joined Napoleon but d'Aboville remained loyal to the Bourbons and forced Napoleon's troops to withdraw. He eventually relinquished the position and obtained an audience with the Emperor in April 1815, following which he was given the mission to organise the coast defenses in Le Havre. After the Second Restoration, the King gave him the title of Commander of the Order of Saint-Louis, and, when he became eligible for retirement, on 6 October 1815, granted him a pension of 2,000 Francs. In 1816, General d'Aboville was a part of the war council which ruled against Counter Admiral Lenoir and Colonel Royer. Taking a brief part to the July Revolution of 1830, which saw the ousting of King Charles X, d'Aboville was then included in the reserve on 22 March 1831. He died July 20, 1843.

References

Sources

 Mullié, Charles – "Augustin Marie d'Aboville", in "Biographie des célébrités militaires des armées de terre et de mer de 1789 à 1850, 1852".

French military personnel of the French Revolutionary Wars
French commanders of the Napoleonic Wars
Burials at Père Lachaise Cemetery
1776 births
1843 deaths
Commanders of the Order of Saint Louis
Barons of the First French Empire
People from La Fère